The Dead Pool is a 1988 American neo-noir vigilante action thriller film directed by Buddy Van Horn, written by Steve Sharon, and starring Clint Eastwood as Inspector "Dirty" Harry Callahan. It is the fifth and final film in the Dirty Harry film series and is set in San Francisco, California.

The story concerns the manipulation of a dead pool game by a serial killer, whose efforts are confronted by the hardened detective Callahan. It co-stars Liam Neeson (in his first action film) and Patricia Clarkson, with Jim Carrey in his first dramatic role.

It is the only film in the series not to feature Albert Popwell, an actor who had played a different character in each of the previous four films.

At 91 minutes, it is the shortest of the five Dirty Harry films. Like those films, The Dead Pool is notable for coining catchphrases uttered by Clint Eastwood's gun-wielding character, one of which is: "Opinions are like assholes; everybody has one".

Plot 
Inspector Harry Callahan's testimony against crime lord Lou Janero puts the mobster in prison. Callahan becomes famous and the target of Janero's men as well as the news media, both of which he dislikes. After Callahan kills four hit men during an ambush, the SFPD assigns Al Quan as his partner; Callahan advises him to get a bulletproof vest, as his partners often get killed. The pair investigate the fatal heroin overdose of rock singer Johnny Squares, found in his trailer during filming of a music video directed by Peter Swan at the Port of San Francisco. Squares' death was not a typical overdose, but actually murder.

Dean Madison, Swan's executive producer, is killed during a Chinatown restaurant robbery. Callahan kills three of the robbers, and Quan captures the fourth. They discover a list in Madison's pocket with Callahan and Squares' names on it. It is revealed that Madison and Swan are participants in a "dead pool" game, in which participants predict celebrity deaths in the Bay area: whether by accident, violence, or natural causes. Movie critic Molly Fisher, also on Swan's list, is soon murdered by an intruder claiming to be Swan — causing panic among the surviving celebrities, and making Swan a suspect.

After Callahan destroys a television station's camera, he must cooperate with reporter Samantha Walker to avoid a lawsuit; if he agrees to a profile of his controversial career, the suit will be dropped. Callahan sees this as a ploy to exploit the danger he is in for its ratings value. Yet after they survive another attack by Janero's men, the incident and her own unwillingness to be the subject of news coverage cause Walker to reconsider the dangers police officers face in juxtaposition with the public's right to know. Meanwhile, at San Quentin State Prison, Callahan uses triple murderer Butcher Hicks to threaten the imprisoned Janero if anything happens to him. Janero ends the attacks, and assigns two men to Callahan as his personal bodyguards, though Callahan initially thinks they are after him.

A man named Gus Wheeler, claiming responsibility for the murders, douses himself in gasoline and threatens to light himself on fire in front of a large crowd. Wheeler is not the murderer, but an attention seeker desperate to appear on camera. Walker foils his plan by refusing to film him; however Wheeler accidentally sets himself on fire, but fortunately Callahan saves him. Impressed by her refusal to exploit Wheeler, Callahan and Walker become close. Meanwhile, Swan tells Callahan and Quan of Harlan Rook, a deranged fan suffering from "process schizophrenia" who thinks the director stole his ideas and work; Swan has a restraining order against him. Rook kills television personality Nolan Kennard, another person on the dead pool list, using a radio-controlled car filled with C4 explosive under the victim's vehicle. Callahan finds a toy car wheel at the crime scene, and later sees another toy car following him and Quan. Recognizing the threat, they flee through the city pursued by the toy car and Rook himself controlling it from his car. Trapped in an alleyway, Rook sends the car in armed. Callahan is able to back the car up enough so the engine takes most of the blast. Both survive, but Quan has broken ribs.

Rook, claiming to be Swan, calls Walker at the television station and invites her to Swan's film studio for an interview. The police discover at Rook's apartment torn posters of Swan's films, large quantities of explosives, and Walker's name replacing Callahan's on the dead pool list. At the studio, Callahan confronts Rook holding Walker hostage. The detective surrenders his .44 Magnum revolver after Rook threatens to slit her throat. Callahan lures Rook to a pier after a chase during which Rook shoots at him with his own gun. Rook runs out of ammunition, and Callahan shoots Rook with a Svend Foyn harpoon cannon, impaling him. Callahan leaves with Walker as the police arrive.

Cast 

Members of the hard rock band Guns N' Roses make uncredited cameo appearances at the funeral of Johnny Squares. They also appear during filming of a "nightmare scene" at the docks, where guitarist Slash fires a harpoon gun through a window and is berated by Swan.

Production 
Eastwood reacted to starring in another Dirty Harry film, "It's fun, once in a while, to have a character you can go back to. It's like revisiting an old friend you haven't seen for a long time. You figure 'I'll go back and see how he feels about things now.'" The Dead Pool was filmed in February and March 1988 in San Francisco.

The Dead Pool is the only Dirty Harry film in which Albert Popwell does not appear. He was not available due to a scheduling conflict with filming on Who's That Girl.

Car chase 
Callahan is pursued through San Francisco's hilly streets in his unmarked Oldsmobile 98 squad car by a miniature R/C (remote-controlled) car (assembled and controlled by Rook) containing an R/C bomb for Rook to detonate. The R/C car used for the film was a highly modified Team Associated RC10 electric race buggy powered by a Reedy motor that had to be geared up high to an 8.4v NiCd battery, topped with an off-the-shelf 1963 Chevrolet Corvette R/C car body by Parma International. The RC10 had its suspension lowered from the original to a lower ground clearance for better high-speed stability. Needing the best R/C car driver to control the RC10 action, Van Horn hired the 1985 IFMAR 1:10 Electric Off-Road World Champion Jay Halsey. At first, Van Horn was unsure if the RC10 could keep up with the Oldsmobile, so for the scene where both vehicles start from the top of the hill, the director allowed both cars to start off together. As a result, the RC10 outran the Oldsmobile, so the scene had to be re-filmed with the Oldsmobile reaching the bottom first. At one point in a scene where the cars interact, the RC10 jumps over the Oldsmobile, lands, and then proceeds to the end of the street to wait for the Oldsmobile. One scene, in which Halsey was only required to drive the RC10 at full speed to where the bomb was to be detonated, required over a week to film. A motorized tricycle with a camera mounted at ground level was used for close-up filming of the RC10 in action. Engine sound effects for the electric-motor RC10 were added in post-production. 

The chase scenes have many similarities with the famous car-chase in the Steve McQueen film Bullitt, which Eastwood has said was his favorite part of the McQueen film. The necessity of closing down various continuously busy city streets meant that the sequences tend to jump from district to district, much as the similar scenes did in the McQueen film, making for a number of continuity errors that are easily overlooked during the fast-paced scenes, just as the motorcycle chase-scenes in the second Dirty Harry film (Magnum Force) jumped around but are seldom mentioned.

Reception 
The Dead Pool received mixed reviews from critics. It holds a 53% approval rating on the review aggregation website Rotten Tomatoes, based on 34 reviews. On Metacritic, the film has a score of 46 out of 100 based on 15 reviews, indicating "mixed or average reviews".

Roger Ebert of the Chicago Sun-Times gave the film three-and-a-half stars out of four and wrote that it was "as good as the original 'Dirty Harry,'" praising it as "smart, quick, and made with real wit." Gene Siskel of the Chicago Tribune also awarded three-and-a-half stars out of four and called it "the second best of the series, beaten only by the 1971 original," explaining that "where the previous sequels have been mostly dour gun blasts, 'The Dead Pool' is a thriller with wit and humour and tension." Vincent Canby of The New York Times wrote that the film "possesses a couple of good jokes, but nothing can disguise the fact that it's a mini-movie in the company of a mythic figure." Variety wrote, "From the original on, Harry has always been a fantasy character but his stories have been involving. Here, he remains absurdly separated from reality in an exceedingly lame yarn that lurches from one shootout to the next." Michael Wilmington of the Los Angeles Times wrote, "Along with the 1976 'Enforcer,' 'The Dead Pool' is among the weakest of the entire 'Dirty Harry' series. With its stylized story-line and almost style-less direction, it sometimes resembles a juggling act with sledgehammers." Desson Howe of The Washington Post wrote, "Unless you're a Clint fan (and — own up — who isn't?) there's little other reason to sit through this one. Eastwood, who's had far bigger concerns recently, such as directing a movie about jazz great Charlie Parker, seems content to mark time. And pick up another cheque."

Box office 
The Dead Pool was released in United States theatres July 1988. In its opening weekend, the film took $9,071,330 in 1,988 cinemas in the US, at an average of $4,563. In total in the US, the film made $37,903,295, making it the least profitable of the five films in the Dirty Harry series.

Soundtrack 
The song "Welcome to the Jungle" by Guns N' Roses appears as the theme song for Swan's movie, as used in a scene during filming where Johnny Squares is lip-syncing. The band can be seen as extras during the funeral scene.

The traditional Dirty Harry End Theme (Variously called "Harry's Theme", "Sad Theme" and with lyrics "This Side of Forever") was given a full Hollywood orchestral production.

End of film series 
Eastwood has publicly announced that he has no interest in acting in another Dirty Harry film. In 2000, he jokingly spoke about potential sequels: "Dirty Harry VI! Harry is retired. He's standing in a stream, fly-fishing. He gets tired of using the pole— and BA-BOOM! Or Harry is retired, and he catches bad guys with his walker?"

See also 
 Dirty Harry (1971)
 Magnum Force (1973)
 The Enforcer (1976)
 Sudden Impact (1983)

References

Further reading

External links 
 
 
 
 
 

1988 films
1988 action thriller films
1980s serial killer films
American action thriller films
Dirty Harry
Fictional portrayals of the San Francisco Police Department
Films set in San Francisco
Films shot in San Francisco
American police detective films
American sequel films
Warner Bros. films
Malpaso Productions films
American vigilante films
Films scored by Lalo Schifrin
American neo-noir films
1980s crime thriller films
1980s vigilante films
Films produced by David Valdes
Films directed by Buddy Van Horn
1980s English-language films
1980s American films